Jose "Pepe" Maristela Sr (born Jose Concepcion Maristela) retired from the Philippine Military with the rank of General. Pepe Maristela, also referred to and known as Joe Maristela, held the rank of Colonel during active Military Duty. After his service in the World War, Maristela led the Philippine Constabulary as its Chief. Maristela is the grandfather of Joe Maristela, an angel investor in healthcare technology in the U.S.

Early life 
Maristela has roots in Pampanga, as well as Tarlac; both provinces in the Philippines.

Military career 
Maristela graduated from the Philippine Military Academy. He was said to have had a "hot temper" and was reprimanded because of this on a number of occasions.

Criminal investigation service & political career 
Before entering into the CIS, in 1957, Maristela served as a Provincial Commander and Director of the Rizal Police Provincial Office.

During the 1960s, Maristela headed the Criminal Investigation Service (CIS) in the Philippines. Maristela was said to have appointed many "special agents" during his tenure, heading the CIS.

In 1963, the President of the Philippines formally announced to the country that Maristela would be running for mayor in the City of Caloocan, the Liberal Party official candidate in that specific race.

After retiring from the CIS, Maristela engaged in intelligence-gathering for Malacañang (Office of the President).

Maristela died in 1979, at his home in Antipolo, Philippines.

References

Philippine Army
Philippine Military Academy alumni
American people of Filipino descent
People from Pampanga
People from Tarlac
1916 births
1979 deaths